The Cost of Living is a 2003 French comedy film directed by Philippe Le Guay.

Plot

Cast 
 Fabrice Luchini - Brett 
 Vincent Lindon - Coway 
 Camille Japy - Milène
 Géraldine Pailhas - Helena
 Isild Le Besco - Laurence 
 Lorànt Deutsch - Patrick
 Claude Rich - Maurice 
 Bernard Bloch - Richet
 Catherine Hosmalin - Karine

External links

References

2003 comedy films
2003 films
Films set in Lyon
Films shot in Lyon
French comedy films
2000s French films
2000s French-language films